Gontaut may refer to:

Armand de Gontaut, baron de Biron (1524–1592), celebrated French soldier of the 16th century
Armand Louis de Gontaut, Duc de Lauzun, later duc de Biron
Charles de Gontaut, duc de Biron (1562–1602), son of Armand de Gontaut, baron de Biron
Charles-Armand de Gontaut, duc de Biron (1663–1756), French military leader who served under Louis XIV and Louis XV
Germà de Gontaut (1355–1386), Occitan poet and merchant
Louis Antoine de Gontaut, (1700–1788), Duke of Biron and a French military leader who served under Louis XV
Marie Josephine Louise, Duchesse de Gontaut (1773–1857), daughter of Augustin François, comte de Montaut-Navailles
Prix Gontaut-Biron, Group 3 flat horse race in France open to thoroughbreds which are four-years-old or above